Storme Webber (born 1959) is an American two-spirit interdisciplinary artist, poet, curator, and educator based in Seattle, Washington.  She is descended from Sugpiaq (Alutiiq), Black, and Choctaw people.

In 2019 she was named a Seattle Living Legacy for building global awareness of the LGBTQ+, indigenous, Two Spirit, and Black populations of Seattle through her art, poetry, performances, and multimedia exhibits.

Early life and education 
Storme Webber was born in 1959 in Seattle in Pioneer Square, formerly known as Seattle's "Skid Row". Her bisexual Black Choctaw father from Texas met her Sugpiaq (Alutiiq) mother there at the Casino, one of the oldest gay bars on the West Coast.  Webber credits her Sugpiaq (Alutiiq) grandmother from Seldovia, Alaska for "starting her 'on the road of life'".  Webber's grandmother raised her, teaching her how to read before she went to school, and how to appreciate music.

At eleven years old, Webber left her family and entered the foster care system.  Due to her advanced academic and creative arts skills, Webber qualified for summer program at Lakeside School.  After participating in the summer program for two years, Webber received a full scholarship to attend the school full-time. Webber came out as a lesbian at 16 years old; as a teenager she organized a social group for lesbians of color which made her mother—who had come out as lesbian at the same age—very angry because she did not want her daughter to have a hard life.

Webber graduated from Lakeside School in 1977, then moved to New York City to attend The New School. In 2015 she earned her MFA in Intermedia Arts from Goddard College in Plainfield, Vermont.

Career 
Webber entered the art, poetry, and performance scene in New York City during the 1980s, where she displayed her first works in galleries in New York and San Francisco.  In 1989 she published her first poetry collection Diaspora.  In that same year Webber also contributed work to Serious Pleasure, a lesbian erotica anthology published by Sheba Feminist Press in London.

In 2007 Webber established Voices Rising: Northwest LGBTQ Artists of Color to create a safe, welcoming, nurturing community of LGBTQ artists of color in Seattle to brainstorm, create, perform, and raise awareness of marginalization and systems of oppression in the larger society. The community maintains an active Facebook page to promote its events and related news articles.

Webber has received recognition for her multimedia works Blues Divine (2014) and Noirish Lesbiana (2014). Blues Divine is an ancestral mix tape which combines a book of poetry with an audiobook read by Webber. Her museum exhibit Casino: A Palimpsest (2017) combines archival photographs and storytelling with an art installation to record the history of The Casino, one of the oldest gay bars  on the West Coast, 
as told and experienced by her family.

Webber has also produced and performed multiple solo theater works such as Buddy Rabbit, Noirish Lesbiana: A Night at the Sub Room, and Wild Takes of Renegade Halfbreed Bulldagger. These performances have earned acclaim in England, the Netherlands, and Germany. She has also been highlighted in documentaries including Venus Boyz, Hope in My Heart: The May Ayim Story, What’s Right with Gays These Days?, (Living Two Spirit), and international performance tours.

Webber currently teaches creative writing at the University of Washington.

Publications 
Books

 
 

Contributions to anthologies

Exhibits 
2017: Casino: A Palimpsest

Performances 
"Buddy Rabbit"

2010: "Wild Tales of a Renegade Halfbreed Bulldagger"

2014: "Noirish Lesbiana"

Film appearances 
Webber has appeared in the following films:

1997: Hope in My Heart: The May Ayim Story

2001: Black Russians (narration)

2002: Venus Boyz

2009: What's Right with Gays These Days?

2009: Living Two Spirit

Awards and recognition 
2009: Jack Straw Foundation Writer

2012: Patricia Van Kirk Scholarship, Pride Foundation

2015: James W. Ray Venture Project Literary Award

2017: Raynier Institute & Foundation, Frye Art Museum Grant

2017: City Artists Funding Program: Seattle Office of Arts and Culture

2019: Named "Seattle Living Legacy" by Seattle Civic Poet Anastacia-Renee

References

Further reading

External links 
 

1959 births
Living people
Artists from Seattle
Interdisciplinary artists
Two-spirit people
American lesbian writers
21st-century American women writers